Leo Karl Heinrich Meyer (3 July 1830 – 6 June 1910) was a German philologist who spent much of his career in the Governorate of Livonia (now Estonia).

Biography
He was educated at Göttingen and Berlin, where he was a student of the Brothers Grimm. From 1862 to 1865, he was professor in Göttingen, and in 1865 he became professor of comparative philology at Dorpat (now Tartu, Estonia). One of his students there was Nikolai Anderson. From 1869 to 1899 he was the president of the Learned Estonian Society. In 1898 he again accepted a chair at Göttingen. He died in Göttingen.

Writings
His contributions to philological literature include:
 Vergleichende Grammatik der griechischen und lateinischen Sprache (Comparative grammar of Greek and Latin; 1861–65)
 Die gothische Sprache (The Gothic tongue; 1869)
 Handbuch der griechischen Etymologie (Handbook of Greek etymology; 1901)
Other writings include:
 Glauben und Wissen (Belief and knowledge; 1876)
 Ueber das Leben nach dem Tode (On life after death; 1882)

References / Further reading

External links
 

1830 births
1910 deaths
German philologists
University of Göttingen alumni
Academic staff of the University of Göttingen
Humboldt University of Berlin alumni
Academic staff of the University of Tartu